Edwin Greutmann (born 14 October 1946) is a Swiss gymnast. He competed at the 1968 Summer Olympics and the 1972 Summer Olympics.

References

1946 births
Living people
Swiss male artistic gymnasts
Olympic gymnasts of Switzerland
Gymnasts at the 1968 Summer Olympics
Gymnasts at the 1972 Summer Olympics
Sportspeople from the canton of Schaffhausen
20th-century Swiss people